Lake Washington is the largest lake in Brevard County, Florida at . The lake may have been named for the U.S. Deputy Surveyor Colonel Henry Washington, after he surveyed the area in 1844.

Hydrology 

It is the 41st largest lake in the state of Florida.

Located adjacent to the City of Melbourne, it is the single most important source of fresh water for the city and the surrounding areas. It furnishes two-thirds of the water to Melbourne's 150,000 customers.

The John A. Buckley Surface Water Treatment Plant is located nearby. It is owned by the City of Melbourne and furnishes it, and other cities, with potable water.

It is one of the lakes that make up the St. Johns River system. Further downstream is the neighboring Lake Winder.

Economy 

Exit 183 off Interstate 95 provides access to the lake.

At the dead end of Lake Washington Road is Lake Washington Park, where boating is permitted.  The park contains a playground and pavilions for parties.

Nearby cities 
 Melbourne
 West Melbourne
 Melbourne Village
 Palm Bay

See also 

 List of lakes of the St. Johns River
 Lake Winder, the next lake downstream
 Sawgrass Lake, the next lake upstream

Footnotes

Washington
Melbourne, Florida
Washington
St. Johns River